Niphoparmena longicornis is a species of beetle in the family Cerambycidae. It was described by Stephan von Breuning in 1939.

It's 7.5 mm long and 2.25 mm wide, and its type locality is Port Natal.

References

longicornis
Beetles described in 1939
Taxa named by Stephan von Breuning (entomologist)